Magnolia Plantation, also known as the Boteler-Holder Farm, is a  historic house and former slave plantation located at Knoxville, Washington County, Maryland, United States. It is a 2-story, five-bay-wide house built about 1835, with a -story three-bay rear addition, set on finely coursed local fieldstone foundations.  Also on the property are several modern outbuildings and a barn, and nearby is a private cemetery with a number of grave markers bearing the name Boteler.

The Magnolia Plantation was listed on the National Register of Historic Places in 1975.

References

External links
, including undated photo, at Maryland Historical Trust

Federal architecture in Maryland
Gothic Revival architecture in Maryland
Houses on the National Register of Historic Places in Maryland
Houses in Washington County, Maryland
Plantation houses in Maryland
Plantations in Maryland
National Register of Historic Places in Washington County, Maryland